P. floribunda may refer to:

 Parentucellia floribunda, a parasitic plant
 Pauridiantha floribunda, an afrotropical plant
 Pectis floribunda, an annual plant
 Pentacalia floribunda, a plant endemic to Ecuador
 Pentaphylloides floribunda, a deciduous shrub
 Periploca floribunda, a plant with perfect flowers
 Phacelia floribunda, a phacelia endemic to San Clemente Island
 Phylica floribunda, an African plant
 Phyllodoce floribunda, a perennial evergreen
 Phymosia floribunda, a plant with stems that contain mucous canals
 Physaria floribunda, a perennial herb
 Pieris floribunda, a shrubby bush
 Pilosella floribunda, a vascular plant
 Pinochia floribunda, a plant species native to North America
 Piptadenia floribunda, a tropical legume
 Pleurothallis floribunda, a flowering plant
 Plummera floribunda, a plant with composite flowers
 Pogogyne floribunda, a mint native to northeastern California
 Potentilla floribunda, a deciduous shrub
 Primula floribunda, a herbaceous plant
 Pseuderia floribunda, an Oceanian orchid